Suyu District is one of two districts of Suqian, Jiangsu province, China.

Administrative divisions
In the present, Suyu District has 14 towns and 3 townships.
14 towns

3 townships
 Jingtou
 Caoji
 Bao'an

References
www.xzqh.org 

 Township,  Township,  Township

External links 

County-level divisions of Jiangsu
Suqian